The Samsung Galaxy J3 (2016) (also known as Galaxy J3 V, Galaxy J3 Pro and Galaxy Amp Prime) is an Android smartphone manufactured by Samsung Electronics and was released on May 6, 2016.

Specifications

Hardware 
The Galaxy J3 (2016) is powered by an Spreadtrum SC9830 SoC including a quad-core 1.5 GHz ARM Cortex-A7 CPU, an ARM Mali-400 GPU with 1.5 GB RAM and 32 GB of internal storage. The J3 Pro has 2 GB RAM and 16 GB internal storage. Both can be upgraded up to 256 GB via microSD card.

It features a 5.0-inch Super AMOLED display with a HD Ready resolution. The 8 MP rear camera has f/2.2 aperture. The front camera has 5 MP, also with f/2.2 aperture.

Software 
The J3 (2016) is originally shipped with Android 5.1.1 "Lollipop" or 6.0.1 "Marshmallow" and Samsung's TouchWiz user interface. It is upgradable up to Android 7.0 "Nougat" on the North American model.

Branded versions 
Some mobile carriers released branded versions of the Galaxy J3 (2016) with slightly different specifications.

Verizon released a branded version called J3 V (SM-J320V) which is powered by an Exynos 3475 SoC including a quad-core 1.2 GHz ARM Cortex-A7, an ARM Mali-T720 with 1.5 GB RAM and 8 GB internal storage. Furthermore it has a 5 MP main camera with f/2.2 aperture and a 2 MP front camera. It is shipped with Android 6.0.1 Marshmallow". The AT&T model (SM-J320A) features the same specifications except for a quad-core 1.3 GHz Cortex-A7 and 16 GB internal storage.

Sprint, Virgin Mobile and Boost Mobile offered the Galaxy J3 (SM-J320P) with the same Exynos 3475 SoC as the J3 V but with 16 GB of storage and Android 5.1.1 "Lollipop".

See also 

 Samsung Galaxy
 Samsung Galaxy J series

References 

Galaxy J3
Samsung smartphones
Android (operating system) devices
Mobile phones introduced in 2016
Discontinued smartphones
Mobile phones with user-replaceable battery